Newtown is an area of the town of New Mills in the High Peak borough of Derbyshire, England.  It is situated west of New Mills proper, on the road to Disley. The county boundary between Cheshire and Derbyshire divides the area between the two counties. It entirely originally formed part of the parish of Disley and the county of Cheshire, and most of it became part of Derbyshire under the Local Government Act 1888 and a separate civil parish under the name 'Newtown'.  The civil parish survived until 1934 when it was added to New Mills parish.

Newtown is the site of New Mills Newtown railway station, which serves the town.

References

Villages in Derbyshire
Towns and villages of the Peak District
New Mills